Zuzana Lešenarová (born 1 August 1977 Nový Jičín) is a Czech former tennis player.

Lešenarová has won 3 singles and 2 doubles titles on the ITF tour during her career. On 18 June 2001, she reached her best singles ranking of world number 290. On 25 February 2002, she peaked at world number 268 in the doubles rankings.

In 1999, she played for the Czech Republic at the 1999 Universiade in Mallorca (Spain) where she won the bronze medal in Women's Singles.

Lešenarová made her WTA main draw debut at the 1999 US Open, receiving a wildcard in the women's singles draw. She lost in the first round to Sandra Klösel.

Biography
Began playing tennis at age 5 with her parents. Coached by her father, Miroslav. Father, Miroslav, is a technician and coaches Zuzana; mother, Helena, is a teacher; has an older sister, Hana, who is a journalist. Graduated from high school in May 1995. Enjoys skiing and playing the violin. Most memorable experience was winning a downhill skiing competition in 1988. Favorite city to visit is Paris. Self-described as an extrovert. Immediate goal is to finish college at the University of San Diego and receive her bachelor's degree.

ITF Circuit finals

Singles: 8 (3 titles, 5 runner–ups)

Doubles: 7 (2 titles, 5 runner–ups)

References

External links
 
 

1977 births
Living people
Sportspeople from Nový Jičín
Czech female tennis players
Universiade medalists in tennis
Universiade bronze medalists for the Czech Republic
Medalists at the 1999 Summer Universiade
San Diego Toreros women's tennis players